Events in the year 2023 in Russia.

Incumbents

Events

Scheduled

21 February - during the Presidential Address to the Federal Assembly, Vladimir Putin announced Russia's suspension of participation in the New START treaty, stating that Russia would not allow the US and NATO to inspect its nuclear facilities. He claimed the United States was continuing to develop new nuclear weapons, and if the U.S. conducted any nuclear weapons tests, then Russia would develop and test its own.
10 September
 2023 Russian regional elections
 By-elections to the 8th Russian State Duma

Deaths

January 
 1 January – Viktor Ivanenko, 75, security officer.
 2 January – Viktor Fainberg, 91, philologist and Soviet dissident.
 3 January
Ruslan Khasbulatov, 80, economist and politician, chairman of the Supreme Soviet (1991–1993).
Aleksey Malashenko, 71, academic and political scientist.
 5 January
Magomed Abdulaev, 61, lawyer and politician.
Albert Rachkov, 95, diplomat and politician, second secretary of the Communist Party of Turkmenistan (1980–1986).
 7 January
Aleksandr Kharchikov, 73, folk singer-songwriter.
Yuri Manin, 85, mathematician (Gauss–Manin connection).
 8 January
Aleksandr Shabanov, 87, chemist and politician, deputy (1995–2003).
Georgy Shayduko, 60, sailor, Olympic silver medallist (1996), cardiac arrest.
Aleksey Slapovsky, 65, novelist, playwright and screenwriter (The Irony of Fate 2).
 11 January – Murtaza Rakhimov, 88, politician, president of Bashkortostan (1993–2010).
 12 January – Sulambek Mamilov, 84, film director (Ladies' Tango, Day of Wrath, The Murder at Zhdanovskaya).
 14 January
 Inna Churikova, 79, actress (Jack Frost, The Very Same Munchhausen, Walking the Streets of Moscow).
 Georgy Gagloev, 25, mixed martial artist, strangled.
 17 January – Vladimir Rusalov, 83, psychologist and anthropologist.
 18 January
 Nikolai Dostal, 76, film director (Man with an Accordion, Cloud-Paradise), screenwriter and actor (Sea Tales).
 Valiulla Maksutov, 68, politician, senator (1996).
 19 January
 Maya Menglet, 87, actress (It Happened in Penkovo, Chance, Bram Stoker's Burial of the Rats).
 Andrey Popov, 59, politician, MP (1993–1995).
 Arsen Sukhovsky, actor (Non-Orphanage).
 Vera Votintseva, 56, singer-songwriter.
22 January
, 91, Russian film director, screenwriter (The Year of the Dog) and writer.
23 January
German Klimov, 81, athlete and screenwriter (Sport, Sport, Sport, Farewell).
Dolores Kondrashova, 86, hairdresser.
Valeri Urin, 88, football player (Dynamo Moscow, Daugava Riga, Soviet Union national team) and manager.
27 January
Alexander Pushnitsa, 73, sambo practitioner, cancer.
28 January
Evgeny Mogilevsky, 77, pianist.
, 81, animator (Leopold the Cat), painter and sculptor.
Vasily Zakharyashchev, 77, politician, deputy (2007–2011).
30 January
Viktor Ageyev, 86, water polo player, Olympic silver medallist (1960).

See also

References

 
2020s in Russia
Years of the 21st century in Russia
Russia
Russia
Russia